Ricardo Verhoeven (born 10 April 1989) is a Dutch professional kickboxer who currently competes in the heavyweight division of GLORY, where he is the reigning Glory Heavyweight Champion. A professional since 2004, he also competed in the K-1, It's Showtime and SUPERKOMBAT promotions. He is currently ranked the number one heavyweight in the world by Combat Press. Verhoeven has been continually ranked as the number one heavyweight kickboxer in the world by Combat Press since September 2014, when the rankings were first established.

Early life
Rico Verhoeven was born in Bergen op Zoom, Netherlands. He began learning martial arts at age five, starting with Kyokushin. He was trained by his father, a karate black belt. After transitioning into kickboxing, Verhoeven began training at the age of seven and started competing against adults when he was only 16 years old, due to his large size.

He has trained mainly in Zevenbergen under Dennis Krauweel at Superpro Sportcenter, with fellow kickboxers Benjamin Adegbuyi, Albert Kraus and Alviar Lima.

Professional kickboxing career

Glory
After competing in K-1, It's Showtime and SUPERKOMBAT, Verhoeven signed with Glory World Series.

He was drawn against Russian mixed martial artist Sergei Kharitonov at the opening round of the sixteen-man 2012 Glory Heavyweight Grand Slam held at Glory 4: Tokyo - 2012 Heavyweight Grand Slam in Saitama, Japan on 31 December 2012. As he was leading the judges' scorecards after the first two, two-minute rounds, he advanced to the quarter-finals where he lost out to the eventual tournament winner Semmy Schilt by the same margin.

He defeated Jhonata Diniz via unanimous decision at Glory 7: Milan in Milan, Italy on 20 April 2013.

He rematched Errol Zimmerman at Glory 9: New York - 2013 95kg Slam in New York City on 22 June 2013. Despite being deducted a point for rabbit punching in round one, he outworked and outstruck Zimmerman for three rounds and won by unanimous decision.

Ghiță rivalry
He caused a major upset to win the Glory 11: Chicago - Heavyweight World Championship Tournament in Hoffman Estates, Illinois, United States in October 2013. After taking a majority decision over Gökhan Saki in the semi-finals, and scoring a controversial knockdown in round one, he beat Daniel Ghiță by unanimous decision in the final.

Rico further established himself by defeating kickboxing legend Peter Aerts by split decision in the tightly contested main event of Glory 13: Tokyo - Welterweight World Championship Tournament in Tokyo, Japan on 21 December 2013.

Verhoeven was scheduled to make his professional boxing debut against Nikolaj Falin at Mix Fight Gala XV in Darmstadt, Germany on 26 April 2014 but his opponent was changed to János Finfera for undisclosed reasons. Verhoeven defeated the Hungarian by second-round knockout.

He rematched and defeated Daniel Ghiță via unanimous decision in a bout for the vacant Glory Heavyweight (+95 kg/209 lb) Championship at Glory 17: Los Angeles in Inglewood, California, US on June 21, 2014.

Zimmerman trilogy
Verhoeven was scheduled to make the first defense of his Glory Heavyweight title against Errol Zimmerman at Glory 19: Virginia, in what would be their trilogy match. Each fighter had previously won once, Verhoeven by decision, and Zimmerman by knockout.

Verhoeven kept to out fighting, looking to deal damage with body kicks and straight shots, while keeping his opponent at distance with snap kicks and teep kicks. With a minute left in the first round, both fighters engaged in a wild exchange, with Errol being dropped at the end of it. He was once again dropped with a front kick, with half a minute left in the round. The fight ended in a technical knockout, as Zimmerman injured his left knee, following a missed spinning back kick.

Adegbuyi fights
For his second title defense, Verhoeven was scheduled to fight the former SUPERKOMBAT Heavyweight GP winner Benjamin Adegbuyi at Glory 22: Lille. Adegebuyi managed to stun the champion in the first round, before Verhoeven took over in the second. He dominated the rest of the affair, picking up in both volume and pace as the fight went on, while Adegbuyi slowed down. Rico won the fight by unanimous decision (49–47, 49–47 and 50–45).

After this loss, Adegbuyi won the 2015 Glory Heavyweight Contender Tournament, to once again earn a title shot at Glory 26: Amsterdam, six months after their first fight. The second fight ended with a first-round KO, with Verhoeven quickly overwhelming his opponent and knocking him out with right hook. After this fight, Verhoeven changed his nickname from "Prince of Kickboxing" to "King of Kickboxing".

Verhoeven was scheduled to defend his title for the fourth time just three months later, at Glory 28: Paris, against the newly crowned FFC Heavyweight champion Mladen Brestovac. Just as with his two previous title bouts against Benjamin Adegbuyi, Verhoeven was thoroughly dominant, despite a slow first round which he lost with one of the judges. He won the fight by unanimous decision (49–46, 50–45, 50–45).

For his fifth consecutive title defense, Verhoeven was to face the Brazilian Anderson Braddock Silva at Glory 33: New Jersey. Verhoeven began the fight with several leg kicks, which he would keep throwing for the duration of the bout, landing 16 kicks from 22 attempts in the first round alone. Early in the second round, he knocked Silva down with an inside right leg kick. After 40 seconds in the second round, Verhoeven once again knocked Silva down, this time with a left leg head kick. He would knock Silva down for the third time with five seconds left in the second round, forcing the referee to wave the fight off.

Verhoeven vs. Hari
The 10 December 2016 bout against former world champion Badr Hari at GLORY Collision in Oberhausen, Germany, was considered a watershed moment for Verhoeven's career, with Hari being a very entertaining, albeit controversial fighter, who had been a dominant force in the kickboxing community, while also being taller (1.98 to 1.96 m) with a reach advantage over Verhoeven. Competing for the first time in over a year, Hari promised he would knock out Verhoeven in the first round. Intending to keep his promise, Hari came out aggressively in the first round, opening a cut on Verhoeven's nose early in the fight. Hari won the first round. The GLORY heavyweight champion returned more aggressive in the second round, but the fight ended by an injury at Hari's arm after which he couldn't continue the fight. Verhoeven scored the 50th victory of his kickboxing career with a TKO.

After defeating Hari, Glory was unable to find an appropriate opponent for Verhoeven, and so arranged for him to fight the reigning Enfusion Super Heavyweight champion Ismael Lazaar in a non-title fight at Glory 41: Holland. Verhoeven dominated the fight, with Lazaar being unable to cover the distance, being six inches shorter than the champion. He won the fight by unanimous decision. Lazaar would later fail a doping test and was suspended for four years.

Glory would once again book Verhoeven in a non-title match against Antônio Silva, in what the website Bloody Elbow called a "gross mismatch". Silva was given a 35-1 odds to win. Verhoeven abandoned his usual strategy of outfighting, unleashing several combinations on the MMA fighter. The fight ended in a technical knockout, after Rico knocked Silva down with a head kick 43 seconds into the second round.

Verhoeven vs. Ben Saddik
Verhoeven fought Jamal Ben Saddik in defense of Glory heavyweight title, on 9 December 2017. In a fight that has been called the biggest fight in kickboxing history due to the size of the contestants, with Jamal being 6' 9", 280 lbs and Rico himself at 6' 5", 260 lbs. Jamal defeated a young Rico in their first meeting in 2011, but since then has had a record of 11 wins to 6 losses, while Rico climbed the P4P rankings and established himself as a kickboxing world champion.

Ben Saddik found success early on in the fight, before Verhoeven took over as the fight went on, winning by a fifth-round TKO.

Verhoeven was again scheduled to defend his title at Glory 54: Birmingham, in a rematch with Mladen Brestovac. Verhoeven had won five straight fights since their first meeting, while Brestovac came into the fight on a three fight winning streak. The champion stuck to his patented outfighting, damaging the challenger with low kicks and front kicks from distance early, and unleashing hand combinations later in the fight. Verhoeven won a comfortable unanimous decision with 50–45 on all five scorecards.

He was scheduled to defend his title for a record setting eighth time at Glory 59: Amsterdam, when he faced the WGP Heavyweight champion Guto Inocente. Inocente would use several illegal moves during the fight, such as a foot sweep and a judo throw, however, Verhoeven would again dominate the bout, winning all five rounds on each of the judges scorecards.

Verhoeven vs. Hari II

For his ninth title defense, Verhoeven was set to fight a rematch with Badr Hari at Glory 74: Arnhem. Since their first fight, Hari had served a prison sentence, and had only fought once in the meantime, he won against Hesdy Gerges by unanimous decision but later turned into a no-contest.

The fight itself took place in the sold out GelreDome, in front of 30 000 fans. Verhoeven began the fight in an uncharacteristically aggressive fashion, and was knocked down at the 1:40 minute mark of the first round. He found more success in the second round, but was once again knocked down with a head kick in the third round. The fight ended in the third round, with Verhoeven winning by TKO, after Hari broke his ankle with a missed kick.

Aside from selling out the arena, the rematch also drew 3.5 million viewers, an estimated 53% of the live television audience in the Netherlands, which was the second highest viewership of a live sports broadcast, in Dutch television history.

Glory 77
It was revealed by Glory in October 2020 that Verhoeven would fight a trilogy match with Jamal Ben Saddik in early 2021, although the exact date and event weren't announced. Their fight was a rubber match, as both fighters held a TKO win over the other. Their fight was later scheduled for Glory 77 on 30 January 2021. 11 days before the event, Ben Saddik withdrew due to a back injury. Accordingly, Verhoeven was scheduled to take part in a four-man heavyweight tournament, facing Hesdy Gerges in the semifinals, after Gerges called Verhoeven out. He won the semifinal bout against Hesdy Gerges by unanimous decision, and the final bout against Tarik Khbabez by TKO, after Khbabez retired at the end of the first round.

Verhoeven vs. Ben Saddik III
It was announced on August 23, 2021 that Verhoeven would make the tenth defense of his Glory Heavyweight Championship against the 2010 K-1 World Grand Prix winner Alistair Overeem. The fight was scheduled for Glory: Collision 3 on October 23, 2021. On October 7, it was revealed that Overeem had suffered an injury in training and was forced to withdraw from the bout. Overeem was replaced by Jamal Ben Saddik, who stepped in on two-weeks notice. Verhoeven defeated Ben Saddik by TKO in the fourth round.

Verhoeven vs. Gerges IV
On April 12, 2022, it was announced that Verhoeeven's next fight would take place at the inaugural "HIT IT" event, a sports and live entertainment show. Although it was initially assumed that the fight would be an exhibition bout, on June 2 it was revealed that he would face the former It's Showtime World Heavyweight champion Hesdy Gerges for the fourth time in his professional career and who he had beaten in all three of their previous meetings. The quadrilogy bout headlined the "HIT IT" event, which took place on October 29, 2022, at the Rotterdam Ahoy. Verhoeven won the fight by a fifth-round technical knockout.

Verhoeven vs. Plazibat
Verhoeven is expected to make his eleventh Glory heavyweight title defense against Antonio Plazibat. The title bout was initially supposed to take place in spring 2023, but was postponed after Verhoeven suffered a knee injury in training.

Professional mixed martial arts career
Verhoeven made his MMA pro debut at RXF 20: Verhoeven vs. Bogutzki in Sibiu, Romania on 19 October 2015 defeating Viktor Bogutzki by TKO in the 1st round due to punches. Prior to his MMA debut he trained in San Jose, California at the American Kickboxing Academy, where he trained with fighters like Daniel Cormier and Jon Fitch.

Fighting style
Verhoeven is tall and very athletic for a fighter his size. Besides his physical gifts, he is an intelligent fighter. He has a wide arsenal of attacks, most notably his powerful low kicks, and a tight defense. He also worked closely with WBC and Lineal heavyweight world champion Tyson Fury, whom he credits with turning his jab into the highly effective weapon it is now.

Championships and accomplishments

Kickboxing
Glory
2014 Glory Heavyweight (+95 kg/209 lb) World Championship Tournament Champion
Glory Heavyweight (+95 kg/209 lb) Championship (one time; current)
Ten successful title defenses
2017 Glory Fighter of the Year
2017 Glory Knockout of the Year 
2019 Glory Highlight of the Year
2021 Glory 77 Heavyweight Tournament Winner
Liverkick.com
2017 Fighter of the Year
Kickboxingplanet.com
2016 Kickboxer of the Year
Bloody Elbow.com
2013 Kickboxer of the Year

Kickboxing record (incomplete)
{| class="wikitable collapsible" style="font-size:88%; width:100%; text-align:center;"
|-
! colspan=9  | Kickboxing record (Incomplete)
|-
| style="background:white" colspan=9  |60 Wins (20 (T)KOs), 10 Losses
|-
! Date || Result || Opponent || Event || Location || Method || Round || Time
|- style="background:#cfc;"
| 2022-10-29 || Win ||align=left| Hesdy Gerges || HIT IT || Rotterdam, Netherlands || TKO (Punches) || 5 || 1:58
|-
|- style="background:#cfc;"
| 2021-10-23 || Win ||align=left| Jamal Ben Saddik || Glory Collision 3 || Arnhem, Netherlands ||  TKO (Punches) || 4 || 0:56
|-
! style="background:white" colspan=9 |
|-
|- style="background:#cfc;"
| 2021-01-30 || Win||align=left| Tarik Khbabez || Glory 77: Rotterdam Final || Rotterdam, Netherlands || TKO (Corner stoppage/Injury) || 1 || 3:00
|-
! style="background:white" colspan=9 |
|- style="background:#cfc;"
| 2021-01-30 || Win||align=left| Hesdy Gerges || Glory 77: Rotterdam Semi Final || Rotterdam, Netherlands || Decision (Unanimous) || 3 || 3:00
|- style="background:#cfc;"
| 2019-12-21 || Win ||align=left| Badr Hari || Glory Collision 2 || Arnhem, Netherlands || TKO (Leg injury) || 3 || 0:59
|-
! style="background:white" colspan=9 |
|-
|- style="background:#cfc;"
| 2018-09-29 || Win ||align=left| Guto Inocente || Glory 59: Amsterdam || Amsterdam, Netherlands || Decision (Unanimous) || 5 || 3:00
|-
! style="background:white" colspan=9 |
|-
|-  style="text-align:center; background:#CCFFCC"
| 2018-06-02 || Win ||align=left| Mladen Brestovac || Glory 54: Birmingham || Birmingham, England  || Decision (Unanimous)  || 5 || 3:00
|-
! style="background:white" colspan=9 |
|-
|- style="background:#cfc;"
|-  style="text-align:center; background:#CCFFCC"
| 2017-12-09 || Win ||align=left| Jamal Ben Saddik || Glory 49: Rotterdam || Rotterdam, Netherlands  || TKO (Head kick and Punches)  || 5 || 1:10
|-
! style="background:white" colspan=9 |
|-
|- style="background:#cfc;"
| 2017-10-14 || Win ||align=left| Antônio Silva||  Glory 46: China || Guangzhou, China || TKO (Referee stoppage) || 2 || 0:43
|- style="background:#cfc;"
| 2017-05-20 || Win ||align=left| Ismael Lazaar ||  Glory 41: Holland || Den Bosch, Netherlands || Decision (Unanimous) || 5 || 3:00
|-
|- style="background:#cfc;"
| 2016-12-10 || Win ||align=left| Badr Hari ||  Glory 36: Oberhausen || Oberhausen, Germany || TKO (Arm injury) || 2 || 1:22
|-
|- style="background:#cfc;"
| 2016-09-09 || Win ||align=left| Anderson Silva || Glory 33: New Jersey || Trenton, New Jersey, USA || TKO (3 knockdowns rule) || 2 || 2:57
|-
! style="background:white" colspan=9 |
|- style="background:#cfc;"
| 2016-03-12 || Win ||align=left| Mladen Brestovac || Glory 28: Paris || Paris, France || Decision (Unanimous) || 5 || 3:00
|-
! style="background:white" colspan=9 |
|- style="background:#cfc;"
| 2015-12-04 || Win ||align=left| Benjamin Adegbuyi || Glory 26: Amsterdam || Amsterdam, Netherlands || KO (Right hook) || 1 || 2:12
|-
! style="background:white" colspan=9 |
|- style="background:#cfc;"
| 2015-06-05 || Win ||align=left| Benjamin Adegbuyi || Glory 22: Lille || Lille, France || Decision (Unanimous) || 5 || 3:00
|-
! style="background:white" colspan=9 |
|- style="background:#cfc;"
| 2015-02-06 || Win ||align=left| Errol Zimmerman || Glory 19: Virginia || Hampton, Virginia, United States || TKO (Leg injury) || 2 || 2:17
|-
! style="background:white" colspan=9 |
|- style="background:#fbb;"
| 2015-01-03 || Loss ||align=left| Andrey Gerasimchuk || Kunlun Fight 15 || Nanjing, China || Decision (Unanimous) || 3 || 3:00
|- style="background:#cfc;"
| 2014-06-21 || Win ||align=left| Daniel Ghiță || Glory 17: Los Angeles || Inglewood, California, USA || Decision (Unanimous) || 5 || 3:00
|-
! style="background:white" colspan=9 |
|- style="background:#cfc;"
| 2013-12-21 || Win ||align=left| Peter Aerts || Glory 13: Tokyo || Tokyo, Japan || Decision (Split) || 3 || 3:00
|- style="background:#cfc;"
| 2013-10-12 || Win ||align=left| Daniel Ghiță || Glory 11: Chicago - Heavyweight World Championship Tournament, Final || Hoffman Estates, Illinois, USA || Decision (Unanimous) || 3 || 3:00
|-
! style="background:white" colspan=9 |
|- style="background:#cfc;"
| 2013-10-12 || Win ||align=left| Gökhan Saki || Glory 11: Chicago - Heavyweight World Championship Tournament, Semi Finals || Hoffman Estates, Illinois, USA || Decision (Majority) || 3 || 3:00
|- style="background:#cfc;"
| 2013-06-22 || Win ||align=left| Errol Zimmerman || Glory 9: New York || New York City, New York, USA || Decision (Majority) || 3 || 3:00
|- style="background:#cfc;"
| 2013-04-20 || Win ||align=left| Jhonata Diniz || Glory 7: Milan || Milan, Italy || Decision (Unanimous) || 3 || 3:00
|- style="background:#fbb;"
| 2012-12-31 || Loss ||align=left| Semmy Schilt || Glory 4: Tokyo - Heavyweight Grand Slam Tournament, Quarter Finals || Saitama, Japan || Decision (Unanimous) || 2 || 2:00
|- style="background:#cfc;"
| 2012-12-31 || Win ||align=left| Sergei Kharitonov || Glory 4: Tokyo - Heavyweight Grand Slam Tournament, First Round || Saitama, Japan || Decision (Unanimous) || 2 || 2:00
|- style="background:#cfc;"
| 2012-06-30 || Win ||align=left| Hesdy Gerges || Music Hall & BFN Group present: It's Showtime 57 & 58 || Brussels, Belgium || Decision || 3 || 3:00
|- style="background:#fbb;"
| 2012-05-27 || Loss ||align=left| Serhiy Lashchenko || K-1 World MAX 2012 World Championship Tournament Final 16, Super Fight || Madrid, Spain || Extra round decision (Split) || 4 || 3:00
|- style="background:#cfc;"
| 2012-03-17 || Win ||align=left| Ben Edwards || Capital Punishment 5 || Canberra, Australia || Decision || 3 || 3:00
|- style="background:#fbb;"
| 2012-01-28 || Loss ||align=left| Errol Zimmerman || It's Showtime 2012 in Leeuwarden || Leeuwarden, Netherlands || KO (left uppercut)|| 1 || 0:59
|- style="background:#cfc;"
| 2011-11-17 || Win ||align=left| Hesdy Gerges || SUPERKOMBAT Fight Club || Oradea, Romania || Decision (Split) || 3 || 3:00
|- style="background:#cfc;"
| 2011-06-18 || Win ||align=left| Raemon Welboren || Thaiboksgala BlokhuispoortKickboxing || Leeuwarden, Netherlands || Decision || 3 || 3:00
|- style="background:#cfc;"
| 2011-05-21 || Win ||align=left| Justice Smith || SUPERKOMBAT World Grand Prix I 2011, Reserve Fight ||Bucharest, Romania || TKO (Referee stoppage) || 1 || N/A
|- style="background:#fbb;"
| 2011-03-06 || Loss ||align=left| Jamal Ben Saddik || It's Showtime Sporthallen Zuid ||Amsterdam, Netherlands || TKO (Corner stoppage) || 2 || 1:00
|- style="background:#cfc;"
| 2010-12-18 || Win ||align=left| Frank Muñoz || Fightclub presents: It's Showtime 2010 || Amsterdam, Netherlands || Decision (Unanimous) || 3 || 3:00
|- style="background:#cfc;"
| 2010-10-09 || Win ||align=left| Michael Duut || Ring Rage Part 5 || Assen, Netherlands || Decision || 3 || 3:00
|- style="background:#cfc;"
| 2010-09-12 || Win ||align=left| Ricardo van den Bos || Fightingstars presents: It's Showtime 2010 || Amsterdam, Netherlands || Decision (Unanimous) || 3 || 3:00
|- style="background:#cfc;"
| 2010-05-29 || Win ||align=left| Dzevad Poturak || It's Showtime 2010 Amsterdam || Amsterdam, Netherlands || Decision (Unanimous) || 3 || 3:00
|- style="background:#cfc;"
| 2010-03-07 || Win ||align=left| Alex Novovic || Time For Action presents: Team SuperPro 10 Year Anniversary || Nijmegen, Netherlands || TKO (Referee stoppage) || 2 || 3:00
|- style="background:#cfc;"
| 2010-01-30 || Win ||align=left| Mutlu Karabulut || Beast of the East || Zutphen, Netherlands || Decision (Unanimous) || 3 || 3:00
|- style="background:#cfc;"
| 2009-11-21 || Win ||align=left| Jantje Siersema || It's Showtime 2009 Barneveld || Barneveld, Netherlands || KO (Left knee to the body) || 1 || N/A
|- style="background:#fbb;"
| 2009-10-24 || Loss ||align=left| Rustemi Kreshnik || It's Showtime 2009 Lommel ||Lommel, Belgium || Extra round decision || 4 || 3:00
|- style="background:#fbb;"
| 2009-08-11 || Loss ||align=left| Brice Guidon || K-1 World GP 2009 Tokyo, Quarter Finals ||Tokyo, Japan || Decision || 3 || 3:00
|- style="background:#cfc;"
| 2009-08-29 || Win ||align=left| Gábor Meiszter || It's Showtime 2009 Budapest || Budapest, Hungary || Decision || 3 || 3:00
|- style="background:#fbb;"
|  2009-06-13  || Loss ||align=left| Ismael Londt || Gentlemen Promotions || Tilburg, Netherlands || Decision (Unanimous) || 3 || 3:00
|- style="background:#cfc;"
| 2009-05-16 || Win ||align=left| Ricardo Fyeet || It's Showtime 2009 Amsterdam || Amsterdam, Netherlands || Decision || 3 || 3:00
|- style="background:#cfc;"
| 2009-03-18 || Win ||align=left| Filip Verlinden || Fights at the Border presents: It's Showtime 2009 || Antwerp, Belgium || Decision || 3 || 3:00
|- style="background:#cfc;"
| 2009-03-14 || Win ||align=left| Petar Majstorovic || Oktagon presents: It's Showtime 2009 || Milan, Italy || Decision || 3 || 3:00
|- style="background:#cfc;"
|2008-11-29 || Win ||align=left| Dennis Stolzenbach || It's Showtime 2008 Eindhoven || Eindhoven, Netherlands || Decision || 3 || 3:00
|- style="background:#cfc;"
|2008-08-09 || Win ||align=left| Koichi Watanabe || K-1 World GP 2008 Hawaii, Super Fight || Honolulu, Hawaii || Decision || 3 || 3:00
|- style="background:#cfc;"
| 2008-04-26 || Win ||align=left| Christiano Delgado || K-1 World GP 2008 Amsterdam, Opening Fight || Amsterdam, Netherlands || Decision || 3 || 3:00
|- style="background:#cfc;"
| 2008-02-17 || Win ||align=left| Redouan Abdelloui || K-1 MAX Netherlands 2008, Super Fight || Utrecht, Netherlands || Decision || 3 || 3:00
|- style="background:#cfc;"
| 2007-12-16 || Win ||align=left| Brunon Sokołowski || Oss Muay Thai || Oss, Netherlands || Decision || 3 || 3:00
|- style="background:#fbb;"
| 2007-05-13 || Loss ||align=left| Said Eljajaui || Fight Night Veghel B Tournament, Quarter Finals || Veghel, Netherlands || Decision (Unanimous) || 3 || 2:00
|- style="background:#cfc;"
| 2007-03-24 || Win ||align=left| Zoltán Tóth || WFCA Muay thai gala, Zuidwest hallen || Roosendaal, Netherlands || Decision (Unanimous) || 5 || 2:00
|- style="background:#fbb;"
| 2006-10-15 || Loss ||align=left| Brian Douwes || Top Team Beverwijk Muay thai gala || Beverwijk, Netherlands || Decision (Unanimous) || 5 || 2:00
|- style="background:#cfc;"
| 2006-04-09 || Win ||align=left| Reduan Abdellaoui || K.O.C. III || Goes, Netherlands || Decision (Unanimous) || 3 || 1:30
|- style="background:#cfc;"
| 2006-02-03 || Win ||align=left| Chris van den Ouweland || Thaiboxing Gala, Zuidwesthallen || Roosendaal, Netherlands || KO || 3 || N/A
|- style="background:#cfc;"
| 2005-11-26 || Win ||align=left| Stijn van Tatenhove || Thaiboxing Gala, Zuidwesthallen || Roosendaal, Netherlands || Decision || 3 || 2:00
|- style="background:#cfc;"
| 2005-05-29 || Win ||align=left| Sander Duyvis || Gala in Zonnehuis || Amsterdam, Netherlands || Decision || 3 || 2:00
|- style="background:#cfc;"
| 2005-04-30 || Win ||align=left| Wilbert Dam || Impact in de Zuidwesthallen || Roosendaal, Netherlands || KO || 2 || 1:56
|-
|-
| colspan=9 | Legend:

Boxing record

Mixed martial arts record

| Win
| align=center| 1–0
| Viktor Bogutzki
| TKO (punches)
| RXF 20: Verhoeven vs. Bogutzki
| 
| align=center| 1
| align=center| 2:11
| Sibiu, Romania
|

Filmography

Personal life
Verhoeven and his ex-wife, Jacky Duchenne, have together two daughters (b. 2011 & 2015) and a son (b. 2017).

Acting
Verhoeven made his film debut in a small role opposite Alain Moussi in the sequel Kickboxer: Retaliation.

Documentary
In 2022, the four-part docu-series RICO: Dream Big followed Verhoeven in the run-up to his fight against Badr Hari and his attempts to break through in Hollywood.

See also
List of male kickboxers

References

External links
 
 
 Profile at Glory
 
 

1989 births
Living people
Dutch male mixed martial artists
Heavyweight mixed martial artists
Dutch male kickboxers
Heavyweight kickboxers
Dutch male karateka
Heavyweight boxers
Mixed martial artists utilizing boxing
Mixed martial artists utilizing Muay Thai
Mixed martial artists utilizing kickboxing
Mixed martial artists utilizing Kyokushin kaikan
Dutch Muay Thai practitioners
Sportspeople from Bergen op Zoom
Dutch male boxers
Glory kickboxers
SUPERKOMBAT kickboxers
Kunlun Fight kickboxers
21st-century Dutch people